Randy Travis is an American country music singer. His albums discography comprises 22 studio albums, including two holiday albums, 17 compilation albums, and two live albums, His first six studio releases have all been certified platinum or higher by the Recording Industry Association of America, with the highest-certified being 1987's Always & Forever, at 5× Platinum certification for shipments of five million copies. Four more studio albums, including his first holiday album, have been certified gold, and his first two Greatest Hits packages are each certified platinum.

Studio albums

1980s

1990s

2000s

2010s

2020s

Compilation albums

1990s

2000s

2010s

Holiday albums

Live albums

References

Country music discographies
 
Discographies of American artists